Lucy Philip Mair (28 January 1901 – 1 April 1986) was a British anthropologist. She wrote on the subject of social organization, and contributed to the involvement of anthropological research in governance and politics. Her work on colonial administration was influential.

Career
Mair read Classics at Newnham College, Cambridge, graduating with a BA in 1923. In 1927 she joined the LSE, studying social anthropology under Bronisław Malinowski, and commenced ethnographic fieldwork in Uganda in 1931. At Malinowski's direction she spent her time in Uganda studying social change, returning to the UK in 1932 to submit her dissertation and receive her PhD. She began lecturing at LSE the same year, but joined the Royal Institute for International Affairs with the outbreak of World War II. In 1943 she moved to the Ministry of Information, then at the war's end took a job training Australian administrators for work in Papua New Guinea.

In 1946 Mair returned to LSE as reader in colonial administration, commencing a second readership (in applied anthropology) in 1952. In 1963 she became a professor, a post she held until retirement in 1968. In 1964 she was made president of Section N of the British Association for the Advancement of Science. She gave the 1967 Frazer Lecture at Cambridge University.

Works
Mair published books and papers throughout her life. Primitive Government, first published in 1962, discusses political patronage in relation to state formation and is cited by over 160 academic works.

Books
 The protection of minorities; The working and scope of the minorities treaties under the League of Nations, Christophers, 1928
 An African people in the twentieth century, G. Routledge and Sons, 1934
 Welfare in the British colonies, Royal Institute of International Affairs, 1944
 Australia in New Guinea, Chponeismalditosrs, 1948
 Native administration in central Nyasaland, HMSO, 1952
 Studies in applied anthropology, Athlone, 1957
 Safeguards for democracy, Oxford University Press, 1961
 Primitive government, Penguin Books, 1962
 The Nyasaland Elections of 1961, Athlone Press, 1962
 New nations, University of Chicago Press, c1963
 An introduction to social anthropology, Clarendon Press, 1965
 The new Africa, Watts, 1967
 African marriage and social change, Cass, 1969
 Anthropology and social change, Athlone, 1969
 Native policies in Africa, Negro Universities Press, 1969
 Witchcraft, Weidenfeld & Nicolson, 1969
 The Bantu of Western Kenya: with special reference to the Vugusu and Logoli, published for the International African Institute by Oxford U.P., 1970.
 Marriage, Harmondsworth, Penguin, 1971
 African societies, Cambridge University Press, 1974
 African Kingdoms, Clarendon Press, 1977
 Anthropology and Development, Macmillan, 1984

RAI
Mair was throughout her working life closely involved with the Royal Anthropological Institute: after winning the RAI Wellcome medal in 1936 she was the Hon Secretary from 1974 to 1978 and the Vice-President for the year 1978–9. After her death, the RAI instituted the Lucy Mair Medal for Applied Anthropology in 1997 to commemorate her.

References

External links
 Interviewed by Jean La Fontaine and Alan Macfarlane, 30 July 1983 (video)

British anthropologists
British women anthropologists
Academics of the London School of Economics
1901 births
1986 deaths
Alumni of Newnham College, Cambridge
20th-century British women scientists
20th-century anthropologists